Euphoria is a 2018 Italian drama film directed by Valeria Golino. It was screened in the Un Certain Regard section at the 2018 Cannes Film Festival.

Cast
Riccardo Scamarcio as Matteo
Valerio Mastandrea as Ettore
Isabella Ferrari as Michela
Valentina Cervi as Tatiana
Jasmine Trinca as Elena
Francesco Borgese as Andrea

References

External links

2018 films
2018 drama films
2018 LGBT-related films
Italian drama films
Italian LGBT-related films
LGBT-related drama films
Gay-related films
2010s Italian films